The Man from Chicago is a 1930 British crime film directed by Walter Summers and starring Bernard Nedell, Dodo Watts, Joyce Kennedy and Austin Trevor. It was produced at Elstree Studios by British International Pictures.

Synopsis
The screenplay concerns an American gangster who moves to Britain and begins to take on the British criminal underworld.

Cast
Bernard Nedell as Nick Dugan
Dodo Watts as Cherry Henderson
Joyce Kennedy as Irma Russell
Morris Harvey as Rossi
Albert Whelan as Sgt. Mostyn
Austin Trevor as Inspector Drew
Billy Milton as Barry Larwood
O. B. Clarence as John Larwood
Dennis Hoey as Jimmy Donovan
Ben Welden as Ted

References

Bibliography
 Low, Rachael. Filmmaking in 1930s Britain. George Allen & Unwin, 1985.
 Wood, Linda. British Films, 1927-1939. British Film Institute, 1986.

External links

1930 films
1930s crime films
1930s English-language films
Films directed by Walter Summers
British black-and-white films
British crime films
Films shot at British International Pictures Studios
1930s British films